Chih Siou (born Liao Chih-siou on November 20, 1995) is a Taiwanese singer-songwriter.

Early life and education 
Chih Siou was born Liao Chih-siou on November 20, 1995, in Taipei, Taiwan.

Musical career 
Chih Siou debuted in 2019 with the album, Elephant in the Room, which incorporates both electronic and folk pop genres. At the 31st Golden Melody Awards, Chih Siou won Best New Vocal Award for his 2019 album. He was named Best New Asian Artist at the 2020 Mnet Asian Music Awards. He is noted for his gender-fluid appearance.

Discography 

 Elephant in the Room (2019)

References

External links 
 

1995 births
Living people
21st-century Taiwanese male singers
People from Taipei
Taiwanese people of Hakka descent